Giuseppe Ferlini (April 23, 1797 – December 30, 1870) was an Italian soldier turned treasure hunter, who robbed and desecrated the pyramids of Meroë.

Biography
Born in Bologna, in 1815 he travelled across Greece, and later he reached Egypt where he joined the Egyptian Army during the  conquest of Sudan. In 1830 he became surgeon major. Under the army, he stayed at Sennar and then at Khartoum where he met the Albanian merchant Antonio Stefani. Later he decided to desert and devote himself to treasure-hunting, determined to either "return home penniless, or carrying unprecedented treasures". Along with Stefani, Ferlini organized an expedition that left for Meroë on August 10, 1834.

Having asked and obtained from the Governor-General of the Sudan, Ali Kurshid Pasha, the permission to perform excavations at Meroë, and spurred by legends from local workers who talked about 40 ardeb of gold, he started to raid and demolish – even using explosives – several pyramids, which were found "in good conditions" by Frédéric Cailliaud just a few years earlier. At Wad ban Naqa, he leveled the pyramid N6 of the kandake Amanishakheto starting from the top, finding treasure composed of dozens of gold and silver jewelry pieces. Overall, he was responsible for the destruction of over 40 pyramids.

Having found the treasure he was looking for, in 1836 Ferlini returned home. A year later he wrote a report of his expedition containing a catalog of his findings, which was translated to French and republished in 1838. He tried to sell the treasure, but at this time nobody believed that such high quality jewellery could be made in Sub-Saharan Africa. The treasures were finally sold in Germany: part were purchased by king Ludwig I of Bavaria and are now in the State Museum of Egyptian Art of Munich, while the remaining – under suggestions of Karl Richard Lepsius and of Christian Charles Josias von Bunsen – was bought by the Egyptian Museum of Berlin where it still is.

Ferlini died in Bologna on December 30, 1870, and was buried in the Certosa di Bologna.

Notes

References

1797 births
1870 deaths
Italian explorers
Military personnel from Bologna
Italian surgeons
Archaeological theft
Egyptian surgeons
Physicians from Bologna